A Physical Readiness Test, also known as a Physical Fitness Assessment, or PFA, is conducted by the United States Navy to determine the physical fitness of their sailors.

Standard testing 
The Physical Fitness Assessment consists of a Body Composition Assessment (BCA) and a Physical Readiness Test (PRT), which includes a timed cardio event consisting of  run/treadmill or a  swim (or an alternate cardio consisting of 12-minutes on a stationary bike), timed curl-ups, and timed sit-ups.

PFA scores from lowest to highest are fail, probationary, satisfactory, good, excellent, outstanding, and maximum, with prefixes of low, medium, and high providing further granularity per NAVADMIN 061/16.

Scores for the cardio (time or calories), the curl-ups (number completed in two minutes), and the sit-ups (number completed in two minutes) are determined by age, sex, and time (for run and swim) or calories (for stationary bike).

Other branches of the DoD have similar standards.

2020 planned changes 
In 2020, sit-ups were replaced with a plank exercise. Additionally, a rowing machine option was added to the aerobics test.

Elite units
Most branches of the US military use modified, enhanced tests of the regular tests of physical stamina and performance as minimum requirements for applicants to special or elite programs. Some of these programs are SEAL, SWCC, Navy Diver, EOD, and other Special Operations Forces. These tests usually include extra components so that running, swimming, and pullups are all assessed in addition to situps, pushups, and the cardiovascular portion. In some cases pushups techniques and swim strokes may be particular to a certain group, including "diver (triceps) pushups", "combat sidestroke" swim strokes done in full uniform with boots by SEAL and SWCC applicants, and strictly monitored pull-up technique.
Within these communities enhanced tests may be given in place of the regular tests, deriving and reporting the data needed for the minimum requirements of the service and maintaining additional data such as swim and pullup data to meet the requirements of their special program.

Deaths
In 2019, an 18-year-old and a 20-year-old woman died due to the physical exertions of the physical tests.

References

External links
 US Navy Physical Fitness Test Standards

Military education and training in the United States
Fitness tests